Usterzai is an administrative unit known as "Union Council" of Kohat District in the Khyber Pakhtunkhwa province of Pakistan.

Kohat District has 2 Tehsils, Kohat and Lachi. Each Tehsil comprises certain numbers of Union council.  There are 27 union councils in district Kohat.

In 2009, a suicide car bombing killed over 30 people.

See also

External links
Khyber-Pakhtunkhwa Government website section on Lower Dir
United Nations
Hajjinfo.org Uploads
PBS paiman.jsi.com

Populated places in Kohat District
Union Councils of Kohat District